Rhyparochromus pini is a species of dirt-colored seed bug in the family Rhyparochromidae, found in the Palearctic.

Subspecies
These two subspecies belong to the species Rhyparochromus pini:
 Rhyparochromus pini intermedius (Puton, 1888)
 Rhyparochromus pini pini Linnaeus, 1758

References

External links

 

Rhyparochromidae